Karkan (also Romanized as Karkān; also known as Karkhān and Qareh Khān) is a village in Enaj Rural District, Qareh Chay District, Khondab County, Markazi Province, Iran. At the 2006 census, its population was 1,437, in 424 families.

References 

Populated places in Khondab County